The character of Nancy Drew – ghostwritten and credited to the pseudonymous Carolyn Keene – has appeared in a number of series over the years.

613 Nancy Drew books have been published as of July 2021 over thirteen different series, as follows:

Series overview
Nancy Drew Mystery Stories (1930–2003; 175 titles + 8 revisions with different stories)
Seven special titles released between 1973 and 1985.
Nancy Drew and The Hardy Boys: Be A Detective Mystery Stories (1984–1985; 6 titles)
Nancy Drew: Girl Detective (2004–2012; 47 titles + 3 "SuperMysteries")
Nancy Drew and the Hardy Boys Super Mystery (2007) (2007–2012; 6 titles)
Nancy Drew Diaries (2013-present; 23 titles + 1 special + 1 upcoming)

For young adults
The Nancy Drew Files (1986–1997; 124 titles)
Nancy Drew and The Hardy Boys Super Mystery (1989–1998; 36 titles)
River Heights (1989–1992; 16 titles + 1 "Super Sizzler")
Nancy Drew on Campus (1995–1998; 25 titles)

For children
Nancy Drew Notebooks (1994–2005; 69 titles)
Nancy Drew and the Clue Crew (2006–2015; 40 titles)
Nancy Drew Clue Book (2015-present; 16 titles + 2 upcoming)

Graphic novels
Nancy Drew: Girl Detective (2005–2010; 21 titles + 3 "New Case Files")
Rereleased under the Nancy Drew Diaries banner, with 10 collections of two titles a book

Nancy Drew Mystery Stories (1930–2003)

Specials
 The Nancy Drew Cookbook: Clues to Good Cooking (1973)
 Nancy Drew Picture Book: Mystery of the Lost Dogs (1977)
 Nancy Drew Picture Book: The Secret of the Twin Puppets (1977)
 The Nancy Drew Sleuth Book: Clues to Good Sleuthing (1979)
 Nancy Drew and the Hardy Boys: Super Sleuths (1981)
 Nancy Drew Ghost Stories (1983)
 Nancy Drew and the Hardy Boys: Super Sleuths #2 (1984)
 Nancy Drew and the Hardy Boys: Campfire Stories (1984)
 Nancy Drew Ghost Stories #2 (1985)

The first four works were published by Grosset & Dunlap. The Nancy Drew Cookbook contained recipes and short stories. Both titles under the Nancy Drew Picture Book banner were illustrated picture books aimed at younger readers. The Nancy Drew Sleuth Book contained short stories that involved Nancy teaching a group of younger girls how she solves her mysteries, and gives lessons to the reader on the techniques used.

The first Nancy Drew and the Hardy Boys: Super Sleuths book was published in 1981, after switching over to Simon & Schuster. The book contained seven short stories in which Nancy Drew crosses over to solve mysteries with The Hardy Boys; both the Carolyn Keene pseudonym and The Hardy Boys' Franklin W. Dixon pseudonym are used. The story was so popular, that it spawned a sequel, a spin-off series, and a Campfire Stories companion.

In 1983, Nancy Drew Ghost Stories was published, also containing seven short stories. It, too, spawned a sequel in 1985. Unlike other specials, though, the first volume was reprinted by the later Minstrel and Aladdin imprints.

Nancy Drew and the Hardy Boys: Be a Detective Mystery Stories (1984–1985)
These titles feature a level of reader-interaction in a manner similar to the Choose Your Own Adventure books. The series was published by Wanderer.

Two more volumes, Jungle of Evil and Ticket to Intrigue, were planned and advertised, but were unpublished after the sale of the Stratemeyer Syndicate to Simon & Schuster.

Nancy Drew Notebooks (1994–2005)

The Nancy Drew Notebooks were aimed at younger readers and featured a Nancy who was still in grade school. The series was published from 1994 to 2005.

Nancy Drew Files (1986–1997)

In 1986, Simon & Schuster, Inc. began publishing a spin-off series, Nancy Drew Files, running concurrently with the main Nancy Drew Mystery Stories line. The Nancy Drew Files were aimed at an older, teenage audience, and is similar in style, target audience, and sensibilities with The Hardy Boys Casefiles.

Starting in January 2014, Simon & Schuster began releasing this series as eBooks.

Nancy Drew Files Volume I and Nancy Drew Files Volume II were published September 24, 2019 under the Simon Pulse imprint. These are reprints of the first six titles in the series, books 1, 2, and 3 in volume I and books 4, 5 and 6 in volume II. Cover art by Fernanda Suarez.

Nancy Drew and Hardy Boys Super Mystery (1988–1998)

The Hardy Boys and Nancy Drew teamed up in this 36 volume series of paperbacks. This series follows the formula of the main characters and their friends typically involved in separate mysteries that end up being connected. The sleuths join forces to solve the overall mystery. This series is based in the Nancy Drew Files and Hardy Boys Casefiles continuity, so murder, romance, and flirtation between the series regulars are common. Nancy Drew and Frank Hardy share an attraction in this series, though after a brief kiss in "The Last Resort" this attraction is not acted on. Subsequent books focus on the respect and friendship that developed between the two and their continued feelings for Ned Nickerson and Callie Shaw. Several spin-off series were cancelled by Simon and Schuster at the end of 1997, including the series Super Mystery (also called Nancy Drew and the Hardy Boys Super Mystery).

River Heights

This series does not feature Nancy Drew beyond a cameo appearance in a couple of books, but is set in her fictional hometown and still written under the Carolyn Keene pseudonym. The series focused on romance and lasted for only 16 titles.

Nancy Drew on Campus

The Nancy Drew on Campus series, like The Nancy Drew Files, is targeted at an older teen audience. Nancy and her friends Bess Marvin and George Fayne go to college; the series focused on college life and romance, rather than all solving mysteries.

Nancy Drew, Girl Detective (2004–2012)

Nancy Drew, Girl Detective replaced the long-running Nancy Drew mysteries series. This new series is written in first person narration, from Nancy's point of view, and features updated and overhauled versions of the main Nancy Drew characters. In addition, new secondary characters are introduced to populate River Heights and appear over multiple books, adding a framework to Nancy's world.

The drastic changes in the main characters' personalities, and a perception in quality decline, earned the series negative reviews from long-time fans. A switch to trilogies gave even more negative reviews, before low sales forced the series to be cancelled in 2011. In 2013, Nancy Drew, Girl Detective was replaced with the Nancy Drew Diaries series.

Papercutz graphic novels (2005–2010)

Beginning in 2005, Papercutz began issuing a new series of Nancy Drew graphic novels as an offshoot of the Girl Detective series. The series is edited by Jim Salicrup, written by Stefan Petrucha, and illustrated by Sho Murase. The manga-style illustrations and technical allusions (Nancy's hybrid car, George's tablet PC) give Nancy and her friends a 21st-century spin.

In 2010, the series was rebooted as Nancy Drew: Girl Detective - The New Case Files. These new novels center around a River Heights that has become obsessed with vampire books. However, the series was cancelled not long after. In 2014, the series began being re-released as an offshoot of the Nancy Drew Diaries series, with two volumes per issue.

Nancy Drew and the Clue Crew (2006–2015)

Starting in 2006, Aladdin Paperbacks published a new series to replace the Nancy Drew Notebooks series for younger readers; it exists in the same universe as the Nancy Drew: Girl Detective series. This series ended in 2015 to be replaced by the Nancy Drew Clue Book series.

Nancy Drew and the Clue Crew features Nancy Drew, George Fayne, and Bess Marvin as eight-year-olds in the third grade at River Heights Elementary School, and solving kid sized mysteries, from finding a stolen ice cream formula entry to the culprit who cut the cake before the bride.  This series also sets George's mother working her own catering company, and reveals George's real name to be Georgia.

Nancy Drew and the Hardy Boys Super Mystery (2007–2012)

Nancy Drew and the Hardy Boys Super Mystery is a crossover spin-off with The Hardy Boys: Undercover Brothers series. The stories are told in first person, alternating chapters, between Frank's, Joe's, and Nancy's perspective. The first title in the series acts as an introduction between the characters in their new universes. This series published one title per year until the end of the Girl Detective and Undercover Brothers series in 2012.

Nancy Drew Diaries (2013–current)

This series, that began in 2013, is a reboot of the Nancy Drew: Girl Detective series. The series continues to follow Nancy and her friends' cases, with first-person narration by Nancy. The series was created to move away from the trilogy format of Girl Detective (besides for the first two books, all titles are now individual mysteries), make books longer than its predecessor, and have a cover artist. The new series also attempted to fix some of the more criticized aspects of Girl Detective, with arguable success.

This is the first series to be available in three different formats; paperback, hardcover (with dust jacket), and eBooks. When the series was first launched, three new titles were expected to come out per year (with the exception of 2013 and 2015, which produced four new titles), but was later reduced to two titles per year in 2016. The first four titles had an initial printing of 25,000 copies in paperback and 2,500 copies in hardcover; books five through seven had an initial print run of 25,000 in paperback and 5,000 in hardcover; and books eight through eleven had an initial print run of 10,000 in paperback and 5,000 in hardcover. Though Simon and Schuster does not release sales information for these properties, on-line sites like Amazon and Barnes and Noble indicate their sales are lack-luster to poor.

Books 1-4 were released in a box set in November 2013, and a boxed set of the first ten books was released in August 2016. In addition, the first three titles were packaged in a single paperback book in June 2016. Also available are unabridged audio books for CD or downloads, read by Jorjeana Marie.

Artist Erin McGuire has served as the cover artist since the start of the series.

Titles

Notes
Famous Mistakes was initially scheduled to be released in August 2018, though it was later replaced with A Nancy Drew Christmas. It was pushed back to January 2019, and still retained its status as the 17th title in the series.
A Nancy Drew Christmas in an unnumbered, special-edition book, and was originally available only in eBook or hardcover format. The paperback edition is scheduled to be released in September 2020, two years after the hardcover release. It features a guest appearance of the Hardy Boys.

Nancy Drew Clue Book Series (2015–current)

This is a reboot of the Nancy Drew and the Clue Crew series published by Aladdin Paperbacks. This is an interactive series, as readers may write down their clues and predictions. A page before the final chapter has questions the reader can answer regarding suspects, clues, and solutions. The first two titles were published July 7, 2015, in paperback, hardcover, and eBook editions written by Carolyn Keene with covers and internal illustrations by Peter Francis. The first three titles have had an initial print run of 35,000 in paperback and 5,000 in hardcover.

Other books/resources
The Nancy Drew Scrapbook (1993)
Nancy Drew's Guide to Life (2001)
Nancy Drew Mad Libs (2005)
Clues to Real Life: The Wit and Wisdom of Nancy Drew (2007)
The Lost Files Of Nancy Drew (2007)
The Official Nancy Drew Handbook (2007)
Nancy Drew Classic Paper Dolls (2011)
Nancy Drew & Her Friends Paper Dolls (2012)
The Curse (2020)

References

External links
 

Book series introduced in 1930